1+1=1 is a collaborative extended play (EP) by South Korean singer-songwriter Hyuna and South Korean rapper Dawn. The EP was released on September 9, 2021, through P Nation and distributed by Kakao Entertainment. The EP consists four tracks, including the title track "Ping Pong".

Background 
On August 30, P Nation confirmed that Hyuna and Dawn will release a duet EP. The next day, P Nation unveiled the tracklisting to the EP on their official social media accounts, revealing "Ping Pong" as the lead single.

Release 
The EP was released on September 9 through many Korean online music services, including Melon. For the global market, the EP was made available on iTunes and Spotify. It was also released in physical format.

Music video 
On September 6, a teaser for the music video of "Ping Pong" was released. On September 9, the official music video of "Ping Pong" was released.

Track listing 
Credits adapted from track listing and Melon.

Charts

Release history

References

2021 EPs
Korean-language EPs
Hyuna albums